also  is a cultural centre in Katsushika, Tokyo, Japan. The Mozart Hall seats 1318 and the Iris Hall has a capacity of 298. AXS Satow were the architects with acoustic design by Nagata Acoustics.

See also
 Shibamata Taishakuten

References

External links
  Homepage

Katsushika
Music venues in Tokyo
Concert halls in Japan